Barbara Eggleston Davies (30 December 1955 – 1 March 2002), was an English teacher and peace campaigner.

Life
Born Barbara Eggleston in London, she was educated at Brighton and Hove School for Girls and the London School of Economics. It was at the latter that she became involved with the Campaign for Nuclear Disarmament and Young Liberals, the youth wing of the Liberal Party. After graduating she taught humanities in a school in London for three years.

She became the first paid worker of Christian CND (CCND) and was its national organiser between 1982 and 1992. In 1989 she founded Dominican Peace Action and after CND worked for the Conference of Religious and the Dominican Justice and Peace Commission.

Mrs. Davies died from breast cancer, and is survived by her husband and two sons.

References

1955 births
2002 deaths
Schoolteachers from London